Antonio Corrionero (1554–1633) was a Roman Catholic prelate who served as Bishop of Salamanca (1621–1633), and Bishop of Islas Canarias (1614–1621).

Biography
Antonio Corrionero was born in Babilafuente, Spain in 1554.
On 6 October 1614, he was appointed during the papacy of Pope Paul V as Bishop of Islas Canarias.
On 26 April 1615, he was consecrated bishop by Pedro González de Mendoza, Archbishop of Granada, with Juan Portocarrero, Bishop of Almeria, and Luis Fernández de Córdoba, Bishop of Malaga, serving as co-consecrators. 
On 17 May 1621, he was appointed during the papacy of Pope Gregory XV as Bishop of Salamanca.
He served as Bishop of Salamanca until his death on 4 April 1633.

References

External links and additional sources
 (for Chronology of Bishops)
 (for Chronology of Bishops)

17th-century Roman Catholic bishops in Spain
Bishops appointed by Pope Paul V
Bishops appointed by Pope Gregory XV
1554 births
1633 deaths